Ralph Hudson Johnson FRSE (3 December 1933 – 1 July 1993) was a 20th-century British neurologist.

Early life and education
 
He was born on 3 December 1933 in Sunderland, Tyne and Wear the son of Sydney Reynald Edward Johnson, an electrical engineer, and his wife, Phyllis. He attended Lawrence Sheriff School and then won a scholarship to Rugby School. He won a double scholarship and obtained multiple degrees at both University of Cambridge and University of Oxford.

Career 
Johnson completed his training at UCL Medical School in London, in 1958. In 1960, he moved to the Radcliffe Infirmary in Oxford, where he conducted research on artificial respiration for poliomyelitis and rehabilitation of paraplegics, winning awards from the Polio Research Fund, British Medical Association and the Schorstein Medical Research Fellowship of Oxford University.

He was awarded multiple doctorates and honorary doctorates throughout his career. In 1976 he was elected a Fellow of the Royal Society of Edinburgh. His proposers were John A Simpson, Robert Martin Stuart Smellie, Henry G Morgan, and Reginald Passmore.

In 1977, he went to the newly-created Wellington Clinical School of Medicine in New Zealand as its first dean. Mixing research with organisational skills, he created a new Diploma in Community Health in 1981. In 1987 he returned to Britain, taking up a Fellowship at Wadham College, Oxford.

Death 
 
A keen apiarist, he died of anaphylactic shock after having been stung by a swarm of his own bees in his garden in Oxford on 1 July 1993.

Publications
Disorders of the Automatic Nervous System (1974) with J M K Spalding
Multiple Sclerosis in Scotland (1978)
Neurocardiology (1985) with Lambie and Spalding

Family
In 1970, he married Gillian S Keith, a social worker. They had two children.

References

1933 births
1993 deaths
People from Tyne and Wear
Fellows of the Royal Society of Edinburgh
Alumni of the University of Cambridge
Alumni of the University of Oxford
British neurologists
People educated at Lawrence Sheriff School
People educated at Rugby School
Academic staff of the University of Otago
20th-century non-fiction writers